Granqvist and Grankvist are surnames of Swedish origin which may refer to:

Granqvist
 Andreas Granqvist, Swedish football player
 Carl Jan Granqvist, Swedish restauranter
 Helene Granqvist (born 1970), Swedish curler
 Hilma Granqvist, Swedish-Finnish anthropologist
 Lasse Granqvist, Swedish sports commentator
 Pehr Granqvist, Swedish psychologist at Uppsala University

Grankvist
Therese Grankvist, Swedish singer and former member of Drömhus 

Surnames
Swedish-language surnames